Shawn Randall Chambers (born October 11, 1966) is an American former professional ice hockey player who played in the National Hockey League (NHL).

Playing career

A defenseman, Chambers played college hockey at the University of Alaska Fairbanks from 1985-1987. The Shawn Chambers Top Defenseman Award is presented annually to the best defenseman on the Alaska Nanooks ice hockey team.

Chambers was selected by the Minnesota North Stars in the 1987 NHL Supplemental Draft.  He played parts of four seasons with the North Stars, including the 1991 improbable run to the finals. 

Chambers was traded to the Washington Capitals prior to the 1991–92 NHL season, however he only played two games with the Capitals due to injuries.  Left exposed in the 1992 NHL Expansion Draft, he was claimed by the Tampa Bay Lightning.  After playing two and a half seasons with the Lightning, he was traded to the New Jersey Devils, and his strong defensive play helped guide the Devils to their first Stanley Cup in 1995.

Chambers would join the Dallas Stars prior to the 1997–98 NHL season, and a year later he would help guide the Stars to their first Stanley Cup Championship in 1999.  He retired after only playing four games for the Stars the next season.

Chambers has the  distinction of being the only player to be selected in the Supplemental Draft to win the Stanley Cup in his playing career.

Chambers also has the unfortunate distinction of having the lowest overall rating of any athlete in a sports video game, with an overall rating of 1 on the video game NHLPA Hockey '93.

Career statistics

Regular season and playoffs

International

Awards
1994–95: Stanley Cup champion (New Jersey Devils)
1998–99: Stanley Cup champion (Dallas Stars)

References

External links

Picture of Shawn Chambers' Name on the 1995 Stanley Cup Plaque

1966 births
Living people
Alaska Nanooks men's ice hockey players
American men's ice hockey defensemen
Atlanta Knights players
Baltimore Skipjacks players
Dallas Stars players
Fort Wayne Komets players
Ice hockey players from Michigan
Kalamazoo Wings (1974–2000) players
Minnesota North Stars players
Minnesota North Stars draft picks
National Hockey League supplemental draft picks
New Jersey Devils players
Seattle Thunderbirds players
Stanley Cup champions
Tampa Bay Lightning players
Washington Capitals players